Laureola dubia is an endemic species of armadillo woodlice, a land crustacean isopods of the family Armadillidae that lives in São Tomé and Príncipe. The species was described in 1983 by Helmut Schmalfuss and Franco Ferrara.

References

Further reading
 Schmalfuss, H. 2003. World catalog of terrestrial isopods (Isopoda: Oniscidea). Stuttgarter Beiträge zur Naturkunde, Serie A Nr. 654: 341 pp.

Woodlice
Endemic fauna of São Tomé and Príncipe
Invertebrates of São Tomé and Príncipe
Taxa named by Franco Ferrara (botanist)
Crustaceans described in 1983